German pop trio Monrose was formed in November 2006 after winning the fifth installment of ProSieben talent show Popstars. Their discography includes four studio albums and eleven singles.

In December 2006, the band released their debut single "Shame", which reached number-one in Austria, Germany and Switzerland. It was certified triple gold in Germany and became the ninth best-selling single of 2007 in Germany. The group's debut album Temptation was released a week later, topping the charts in Austria, Germany and Switzerland, and was subsequently certified double platinum in Germany for more than 400,000 units shipped. The albums spawned one more single, "Even Heaven Cries", which peaked at number six in Germany.

Their second album Strictly Physical was released in September 2007 and reached number two in Germany. It was certified gold in Germany and Austria. Strictly Physical produced three top ten singles, including their second number-one single "Hot Summer" which was also certified gold in Germany and Austria, and became the fifteenth best-selling single of 2007 in Germany.

The group's third studio album I Am was released in October 2008 throughout German-speaking Europe followed by a fourth studio album, entitled Ladylike, in June 2010. Latter became the band's lowest-charting effort; it reached number ten on the German Albums Chart.

Studio albums

EPs

Singles

Other appearances

Videography

Video albums

Music videos

References

External links

 Official website
 

Discographies of German artists
Pop music group discographies